John Fairfield (January 30, 1797December 24, 1847) was an attorney and politician from Maine.  He served as a U.S. Congressman, governor and U.S. Senator.

was born in Pepperellborough, Massachusetts (now Saco, Maine) and attended the schools of York County.  After serving in the War of 1812, he pursued a business career before deciding to become an attorney, and after in the office of an established lawyer and judge, Fairfield attained admission to the bar in 1826.  He practiced in Saco and Biddeford, and became active in politics as a Democrat.

He was elected to the US House in 1834, reelected in 1836, and served from 1835 until 1838, when he resigned to become governor.  Elected in 1838, he served from 1839 to 1841.  He returned to the governorship in 1842, and served until resigning in 1843 to accept election to the U.S. Senate.  He was elected to the final four years of the term in 1844, and served until his death.

Fairfield died in Washington, D.C., and was buried at Laurel Hill Cemetery in Saco.

Early life
Fairfield was born in Pepperellborough, Massachusetts (now Saco, Maine), and was the eldest of six children born to Ichabod and Sarah (Nason) Fairfield.  He attended the Saco schools, Thornton Academy, and Limerick Academy.  Fairfield is known to have served on the crew of a privateer during the War of 1812, which led to the nickname "Sailor Boy", but the exact circumstances of his wartime service are not known.  After completing his education, Fairfield began a career as a merchant before deciding to pursue a legal career.  He studied law in the office of attorney and judge Ether Shepley, and was admitted to the bar in 1826.

Start of career
Fairfield practiced Saco and Biddeford in partnership with George Thacher, and specialized in courtroom pleadings and trials.  Fairfield was appointed a trustee of Thornton Academy in 1826 and served as president of the board from 1845 to 1847.  He was appointed Reporter of Decisions for the Maine Supreme Judicial Court in 1832, and authored Supreme Court Reports, published in Augusta between 1835 and 1837.  In 1845, Bowdoin College awarded Fairfield the honorary degree of Master of Arts.

Congressman
In 1834 he was elected to the United States House of Representatives as a Democrat.  He was reelected in 1836, and served from March 4, 1835 to December 24, 1838, when he resigned to begin his first term as governor.  During his time in the House, Fairfield became nationally known when he spoke in the House to demand an investigation into the duel between Congressmen Jonathan Cilley and William J. Graves, which resulted in Cilley's death.  In insisting on an investigation, Fairfield broke with the custom of the time, largely favored by pro-slavery Southern members, of not referring to private "affairs of honor" on the House floor.  Fairfield's efforts resulted in passage of a law making it illegal to issue a dueling challenge within the city limits of Washington, D.C., even if the duel was planned for a site outside the city.

Governor
Fairfield was the Governor of Maine from 1838 to 1841.  He returned to office again in 1842, and served until resigning in 1843. During Fairfield's governorship, the Aroostook War erupted as the U.S. and Great Britain continued a dispute over the boundary between Maine and New Brunswick, Canada.  Both sides dispatched militia to the contested area and several Canadian militiamen were captured.  No one was killed, but two Canadians were injured by bears prior to the enactment of the Webster–Ashburton Treaty that ended the dispute.

U.S. Senator
He resigned during his second tenure as governor to accept election to The U.S. Senate, filling the vacancy caused by the resignation of Reuel Williams.  He was elected in 1844 to complete the final four years of the term, and served from March 7, 1843 until his death.  Fairfield was chairman of the Committee on Naval Affairs in the 29th and 30th Congresses.  At the 1844 Democratic National Convention, Fairfield's name was placed in nomination for vice president after Silas Wright declined; He received the most votes on the second ballot, but on the third ballot the nomination went to George M. Dallas.

Death and burial
Fairfield died suddenly in Washington, D.C., on December 24, 1847.  According to published reports, Fairfield suffered from knee pain, and had been operated on previously.  When he sought treatment on this occasion, his doctor punctured the skin around his knees to drain built-up fluid, then injected a copper sulfate solution, which was thought at the time to provide relief of the pain and swelling associated with rheumatism.  The doctor did not remove the solution before it was absorbed into Fairfield's circulatory system, and intense pain, paralysis and death resulted.

Fairfield's funeral was held at Saco's Congregational Church on December 1, 1848.  He was buried at Laurel Hill Cemetery in Saco.

Family
On September 25, 1825, Fairfield married Anna Paine Thornton, the daughter of Dr. Thomas G. Thornton, a former U.S. Marshal for Maine and a niece of Richard Cutts and Anna Paine Cutts.  They were the parents of nine children, and Mrs. Fairfield died on July 18, 1882.

Legacy 
John Fairfield is the namesake of the town of Fort Fairfield, Maine. In 1962, the Saco school district constructed an elementary school which was named for him.

See also
 List of United States Congress members who died in office (1790–1899)

References

Sources

Books

Internet

External links
 
 
 John Fairfield at National Governors Association

1797 births
1847 deaths
People from Saco, Maine
American people of English descent
Jacksonian members of the United States House of Representatives from Maine
Democratic Party United States senators from Maine
Democratic Party governors of Maine
Politicians from Biddeford, Maine
19th-century American politicians
People from Maine in the War of 1812
Burials in Maine